Tarsila do Amaral: Inventing Modern Art in Brazil is a book about the work of the Brazilian modernist artist Tarsila do Amaral by curators Stephanie D'Alessandro and Luis Pérez-Oramas published by Yale University Press in 2017.

Critical reception 
The book was reviewed in "Inventando a arte moderna no Brasil" Correspondance Magazine 11 January 2018.

Accompanying exhibitions 
Tarsila do Amaral: Inventing Modern Art in Brazil accompanied exhibitions at the Art Institute of Chicago and the Museum of Modern Art in New York.

References 

2017 non-fiction books
Books about Brazil
Books about artists
Art Institute of Chicago
Yale University Press books